Sasha Issenberg is an American journalist. His articles have been published in Philadelphia, Slate, the Washington Monthly, The New York Times Magazine, The Atlantic, Boston, The Boston Globe, Monocle and George, where he was a contributing editor.

Biography
Issenberg was born to a Jewish family and is a 2002 graduate of Swarthmore College.

In 2016, he covered the 2016 presidential campaign for Bloomberg News.

In 2016, he co-founded the company Votecastr, to track the  2016 Presidential Election in real-time, publishing the results of turnout tracking at Poll Locations online throughout the day.

In 2018, he was named the UC Regents' Professor at UCLA, where he taught a course on understanding presidential campaign victories through the stories reporters, academics, and historians tell about those victories.

His writing typically focuses on politics, business, diplomacy, and culture. Issenberg covered the 2008 election as a reporter for The Boston Globe.

Books
He is the author of the book The Sushi Economy, about sushi and globalization, which was published in May 2007. He is also the author of The Victory Lab: The Secret Science of Winning Campaigns about the new science of political campaigns.<ref>"Sasha Issenberg", MIT Technology Review" Retrieved on 24 July 2013.</ref>  He has also written a book on medical tourism. His most recent book is The Engagement: America's Quarter-Century Struggle Over Same-Sex Marriage''.

References

External links 
 
 Philadelphia Inquirer interview
 

Year of birth missing (living people)
Living people
Swarthmore College alumni
American male journalists
Jewish American journalists
21st-century American non-fiction writers
21st-century American male writers
21st-century American Jews